NA-265 Ziarat-cum-Pishin-cum-Karezat is a newly created constituency for the National Assembly of Pakistan. It comprises the district of Pishin, Karezat and Ziarat from the province of Balochistan.

Assembly Segments

Members of Parliament

2018-2022: NA-262 Pishin

Election 2018 

General elections were held on 25 July 2018.

†JUI-F contested as part of MMA

See also
NA-264 Quetta-III
NA-266 Killa Abdullah-cum-Chaman

References 

Pishin